is a Japanese track and field athlete. She competed in the women's long jump at the 1964 Summer Olympics.

References

1946 births
Living people
Place of birth missing (living people)
Japanese female long jumpers
Olympic female long jumpers
Olympic athletes of Japan
Athletes (track and field) at the 1964 Summer Olympics
Japan Championships in Athletics winners
20th-century Japanese women
21st-century Japanese women